The 1999–2000 NBA season was the Nets' 33rd season in the National Basketball Association, and 24th season in East Rutherford, New Jersey. During the off-season, the Nets re-acquired Johnny Newman from the Los Angeles Clippers, and re-signed free agent Sherman Douglas. Without Jayson Williams, who missed the entire season with a knee injury from the previous season, the Nets struggled losing 15 of their first 17 games, but would eventually get hot winning 13 of their next 18 games, and find themselves near the playoff picture with a 31–40 record as of March 30. However, a rash of late season injures cost the team to lose their final eleven games, finishing sixth in the Atlantic Division with a 31–51 record.

Stephon Marbury averaged 22.2 points, 8.4 assists and 1.5 steals per game, and was named to the All-NBA Third Team, while Keith Van Horn averaged 19.2 points and 8.5 rebounds per game, and Kendall Gill provided the team with 13.1 points and led them with 1.8 steals per game, ranking him ninth in the league with 139 total steals. In addition, Kerry Kittles contributed 13.0 points and 1.3 steals per game, but only played 62 games due to a knee injury, while off the bench, Newman played a sixth man role, averaging 10.0 points per game, Lucious Harris contributed 6.7 points per game, and Jamie Feick led the team with 9.3 rebounds per game. During the 1999–2000 season, Marbury and Gill both reached different milestones, as Marbury dished out his 2,000th assist, and Gill scored his 10,000th career point.

Following the season, head coach Don Casey was fired, while Scott Burrell and Gheorghe Mureșan were both released to free agency, Elliot Perry signed as a free agent with the Orlando Magic, and Williams retired after nine seasons in the NBA.

Offseason

NBA Draft

Roster

Roster notes
 Center Jayson Williams missed the entire season due to a leg injury.

Regular season
The Nets started the season at 2-15, a franchise record low. Despite the poor start, the Nets rallied back to compete for a playoff spot. The Nets were still alive in the playoff race at the beginning of April with three weeks left in the season. After the first week of April, the team was without their leading scorer, Stephon Marbury, who struggled with knee injuries. Other injuries included rookie Evan Eschmeyer (ankle), and starting shooting guard Kerry Kittles (knee). The Nets were officially eliminated from playoff contention on April 7 after a 103-85 loss to the Miami Heat. The team finished the season by losing their final 11 games of the year.

Season standings

Record vs. opponents

Schedule

Player statistics

Regular season

|-
|Stephon Marbury
|74
|74
|38.9
|.432
|.283
|.813
|3.2
|8.4
|1.5
|0.2
|22.2
|-
|Keith Van Horn
|80
|80
|34.8
|.445
|.368
|.847
|8.5
|2.0
|0.8
|0.8
|19.2
|-
|Kendall Gill
|76
|75
|31.0
|.414
|.256
|.710
|3.7
|2.8
|1.8
|0.5
|13.1
|-
|Kerry Kittles
|62
|61
|30.6
|.437
|.400
|.795
|3.6
|2.3
|1.3
|0.3
|13.0
|-
|Johnny Newman
|82
|9
|21.5
|.446
|.379
|.838
|1.9
|0.8
|0.6
|0.1
|10.0
|-
|Lucious Harris
|77
|11
|19.6
|.428
|.330
|.798
|2.4
|1.3
|0.8
|0.1
|6.7
|-
|Scott Burrell
|74
|9
|18.1
|.394
|.353
|.780
|3.5
|1.0
|0.9
|0.6
|6.1
|-
|Sherman Douglas
|20
|2
|15.5
|.500
|.313
|.893
|1.5
|1.7
|0.9
|0.0
|6.0
|-
|Jamie Feick
|81
|17
|27.7
|.428
|1.000
|.707
|9.3
|0.8
|0.5
|0.5
|5.7
|-
|Elliot Perry
|60
|5
|13.4
|.435
|.282
|.806
|1.0
|2.3
|0.7
|0.0
|5.3
|-
|Gheorge Muresan
|30
|2
|8.9
|.456
|
|.605
|2.3
|0.3
|0.0
|0.4
|3.5
|-
|Evan Eschmeyer
|31
|5
|12.0
|.528
|
|.500
|3.5
|0.7
|0.3
|0.7
|2.9
|-
|Jim McIlvaine
|66
|53
|15.9
|.416
|
|.518
|3.5
|0.5
|0.4
|1.8
|2.4
|-
|Michael Cage
|20
|7
|12.1
|.500
|
|1.000
|4.1
|0.5
|0.4
|0.4
|1.4
|-
|Mark Hendrickson
|5
|0
|4.8
|.000
|
|.500
|0.4
|0.6
|0.0
|0.0
|0.2
|}
Player Statistics Citation:

Awards and records
 Stephon Marbury, All-NBA Third Team

Transactions

References

 New Jersey Nets on Database Basketball
 New Jersey Nets on Basketball Reference

New Jersey Nets seasons
New Jersey
New Jersey Nets
New Jersey Nets
20th century in East Rutherford, New Jersey
Meadowlands Sports Complex